The Puratchi Thalaivar Dr. M. G. Ramachandran Central Railway Station–Thiruvananthapuram AC Superfast Express (train number 22207/22208) (formerly Chennai–Thiruvananthapuram AC Duronto Express) is a Superfast train of the Indian Railways, announced in 2011–12 Railway Budget by Mamata Banerjee (Minister of Railways) connecting Chennai, Tamil Nadu to Thiruvananthapuram, Kerala.

The train was first flagged off on 15 December 2012 by Minister of State, Mr Shashi Tharoor. The train has been converted from non-stop Duronto to a AC Superfast Express with effect from 22.11.2013, with commercial stoppages at Ernakulam Junction and Kollam Junction. An additional stoppage at Alappuzha was announced with effect from 25 December 2013. From 20 April 2016, additional stoppages have been scheduled at Thrissur, Coimbatore, Salem and Palakkad stations in a bid to increase patronage.

Coach composition
The train runs with pure ICF coaches. It carries:

 1 AC First Class
 3 AC two tier
 1 Pantry
 8 AC three tier
 2 SLR cxars

Timings
Train number 22207 (on Tuesday and Friday) leaves MGR Chennai Central at 04:25 PM and reaches Thiruvananthapuram Central at 07:15 AM on the next day (Wednesday and Saturday respectively) covering the journey in 14 hours 50 minutes.
Train number 22208 (on Wednesday and Sunday) leaves Thiruvananthapuram at 07:15 PM and reaches MGR Chennai Central at 10:15 AM on the next day (Thursday and Monday respectively) covering the whole journey in 15 hours.

Fastest:

 22207 is the 2nd fastest train between Puratchi Thalaivar Dr. M. G. Ramachandran Central railway station (Chennai Central) and Coimbatore Junction & Thrissur and Thiruvananthapuram Central.
 22208 is the fastest between Thiruvananthapuram Central and Thrissur.

Stoppages
 Thiruvananthapuram Central railway station
 Kollam Junction railway station
 Alappuzha railway station
 
 Thrissur railway station
 
 
 
 
 
 Puratchi Thalaivar Dr. M. G. Ramachandran Central railway station (Chennai Central)

See also
Chennai Central
Thiruvananthapuram Central

References

 https://web.archive.org/web/20131224105840/http://www.sr.indianrailways.gov.in/view_detail.jsp?lang=0&id=0%2C4%2C268&dcd=1748&did=1384945469786E10FEB01DA729364AF74C1E333ABCD05.web103

External links
 http://www.thehindubusinessline.com/news/states/tn-cm-flaggs-off-duronto-trains-to-madurai-and-thiruvananthapuram/article4203779.ece

Transport in Chennai
Transport in Thiruvananthapuram
Rail transport in Tamil Nadu
Rail transport in Kerala
AC Express (Indian Railways) trains
Railway services introduced in 2012